The emphasis mark or emphasis dot is a typographic marking used in some East Asian languages to indicate emphasis. The markings takes in many forms like, a dot or a bullet, a circle, or a triangle. It was used more traditionally, but nowadays, with technology, quotations or changing of font style prevails.

In Chinese 

In China and Hong Kong, the emphasis mark is used in textbooks and teaching materials. It is centred under each character highlighted in the horizontal texts, and centred to the right of each character in the vertical texts.

In Japanese 

In Japan, the emphasis mark (  or  ) is usually a dot or a sesame dot and is centred above each character in the horizontal texts and to the right of each character in the vertical texts.

It is not unusual for kenten and ruby to concur on the same side of the main text (usually above or to the right), but this feature has not been possible with CSS.

In Korean 
In South Korea, the emphasis mark usually rules as a dot or circle centred above the characters in the horizontal texts and to the right of the characters in the vertical texts.

Examples:

 using the CSS  property:
 한글의 본 이름은 훈민정음이다.
 중요한 것은 왜 사느냐가 아니라 어떻게 사느냐 하는 문제이다.
 using positioned characters: :
 한글의 본 이름은 •훈•민•정•음이다.
 중요한 것은 ◦왜 ◦사◦느◦냐◦가 아니라 ◦어◦떻◦게 ◦사◦느◦냐 하는 문제이다.

Characters 
Apart from any single character, the following characters are used as emphasis marks in some implementations.

See also 
 Chinese punctuation
 Japanese punctuation
 Korean punctuation

References 

 
 
 

Typographical symbols
Pages with unreviewed translations
East Asian typography